"True Colors" is a song written by American songwriters Billy Steinberg and Tom Kelly. It was both the title track and the first single released from American singer Cyndi Lauper's second album (1986). Released late in the summer of 1986, the song would become a major hit for Lauper, spending two weeks at number one on the US Billboard Hot 100, becoming her last single to occupy the top of the chart. It received a Grammy Award nomination for Best Female Pop Vocal Performance.

Composition
Billy Steinberg originally wrote "True Colors" about his own mother. Tom Kelly altered the first verse and the duo originally submitted the song to Anne Murray, who passed on recording it, and then to Cyndi Lauper. Their demo was in the form of a piano-based gospel ballad like "Bridge over Troubled Water".  Steinberg told Songfacts that "Cyndi completely dismantled that sort of traditional arrangement and came up with something that was breathtaking and stark." Other songs they wrote for Lauper include "I Drove All Night" and "Unconditional Love".

Music video
The accompanying music video for the song, which received heavy rotation on MTV, was directed by American choreographer Patricia Birch. In the video, Lauper sings on a dark soundstage, sitting beside a drum and holding a black flower. A young girl who explores a beach takes the flower and ends up seeing two women, one light-skinned and one dark-skinned, drinking tea on a boat. Lauper appears on the beach in an elaborate jeweled headdress with a shell in her hand. She is then seen lying on a white sheet, which a long haired man (David Wolff) proceeds to pull. They eventually share a kiss. Lauper is then seen walking on the beach with a skirt made of newspaper while she walks past a class of schoolchildren. At the end of the video, she leans over a pool of water, in a scene reminiscent of the album photo cover. The video ends as it began, only now, Lauper is beating on the drum four times, in time with the music.

Reception and legacy
The single reached number one on the Billboard Hot 100 on October 25, 1986, beating Tina Turner's "Typical Male" to the top spot. It also peaked at number three in Australia and New Zealand, and number 12 on the UK Singles Chart.

"True Colors" also became a standard in the gay community. In various interviews, Lauper elaborated that the song had resonated with her because of the recent death of her friend, Gregory Natal, from HIV/AIDS. Years later, Lauper co-founded the True Colors Fund, a non-profit organization dedicated to eradicating LGBT youth homelessness.

The single was also featured in a 1999 promo for PBS Kids.

On December 13, 2022, Lauper performed the song at the ceremony where U.S. President Joe Biden signed the Respect for Marriage Act into law.

Tours
Lauper embarked on a True Colors Tour in 2007 with several other acts, including Eddie Money, Deborah Harry and Erasure. The tour was for the Human Rights Campaign to promote LGBT rights in the US and beyond. A second True Colors Tour occurred in 2008.

Track listings
 7-inch single
 "True Colors" – 3:45
 "Heading for the Moon" – 3:17

 European 12-inch single
 "True Colors" – 3:45
 "Heading for the Moon" – 3:17
 "Money Changes Everything" (Live) – 6:04

Credits and personnel
 Cyndi Lauper – lead vocals, arrangements, backing vocals
 Peter Wood – keyboards, arrangements
 John McCurry – guitars
 Neil Jason – bass guitar
 Jimmy Bralower – LinnDrum programming, percussion, jam box
 Angela Clemmons-Patrick – backing vocals

Charts

Weekly charts

Year-end charts

Certifications

Phil Collins version

In 1998, the song was recorded by English musician Phil Collins for his first greatest hits album, ...Hits (1998). R&B singer Kenneth "Babyface" Edmonds produced and provided backing vocals. The track peaked at number 12 on the U.S. Billboard Bubbling Under Hot 100, number two on the Billboard Adult Contemporary chart, and number 26 on the UK Singles Chart. It additionally reached the top 40 in Austria, Canada, France, Germany, and Hungary.

In 2004, a live rehearsal version was released on Collins' Love Songs: A Compilation... Old and New album.

Track listings
UK CD1 and cassette single
 "True Colors" – 4:33
 "I Missed Again" – 3:41
 "In the Air Tonight" – 7:32

UK CD2
 "True Colors" – 4:33
 "Don't Lose My Number" – 4:47
 "Take Me Home" – 5:51

European CD single
 "True Colors" – 4:33
 "In the Air Tonight" – 7:32

Australian CD single
 "True Colors" – 4:33
 "In the Air Tonight" – 7:32
 "Don't Lose My Number" – 4:47
 "I Missed Again" – 3:41

Credits and personnel
Credits are adapted from the UK CD1 liner notes.

Studio
 Recorded and mixed at Brandon's Way Recording (Los Angeles)

Personnel

 Tom Kelly – writing
 Billy Steinberg – writing
 Phil Collins – vocals, drums
 Michael Thompson – guitar
 Cornelius Mims – bass
 Greg Phillinganes – acoustic piano, Wurlitzer
 Babyface – backing vocals, keyboards, drum programming, production
 Sheila E. – percussion
 Eric Rigler – Uilleann pipes
 Jon Gass – mixing
 E'lyk – assistant mixing engineer
 Paul Boutin – engineering
 Ivy Skoff – production coordination
 Wherefore ART? – artwork design, illustration
 Trevor Keys – photography

Charts

Weekly charts

Year-end charts

Release history

Kasey Chambers version

In 2003, Australian singer-songwriter Kasey Chambers' recording of "True Colors" became the theme song for the 2003 Rugby World Cup. The song peaked at number four, was certified gold by the Australian Recording Industry Association (ARIA), and went on to be the 76th best-selling single in Australia that year.

Track listing
Australian CD single
 "True Colours"
 "If I Could" (live)
 "Lonely"

Charts

Weekly charts

Year-end charts

Certifications

Other versions

In 2001, Sarina Paris recorded the song and it was included on her self-titled debut album. Released on May 22, the album was composed of songs co-written by Paris, with the exception of this cover. The album reached number 167 on the Billboard 200 in the U.S.

In 2009, Jenna Ushkowitz performed it on the television program Glee, and it was released as a single, billed as "True Colors (Glee Cast Version)". This version was included on the compilation album Glee: The Music, Volume 2, released on December 4, 2009. The single charted on the Billboard Hot 100 in the U.S. and reached number 15 in Ireland, number 35 in the United Kingdom, number 38 in Canada and number 47 in Australia.

In 2012, Artists Against Bullying (often styled as "Artists Against"), an agglomeration of seven Canadian musicians, re-recorded the song and released it during Bullying Awareness Week. The project was inspired by the increase in teen bullying and cyberbullying, especially the Amanda Todd case, with proceeds being donated to Kids Help Phone, a Canadian counseling service for children and youth. The artists involved in the recording were Lights, Pierre Bouvier (from Simple Plan), Jacob Hoggard (from Hedley), Fefe Dobson, Kardinal Offishall, Alyssa Reid and Walk Off the Earth. The song entered the Canadian Singles Top 100 chart at number 10 the week it was released.

References

External links
True Colors at Second Hand Songs

1986 songs
1986 singles
1998 singles
2003 singles
Cyndi Lauper songs
Phil Collins songs
Kasey Chambers songs
Billboard Hot 100 number-one singles
RPM Top Singles number-one singles
Songs written by Tom Kelly (musician)
Songs written by Billy Steinberg
Pop ballads
1980s ballads
LGBT-related songs
Epic Records singles
Atlantic Records singles
Virgin Records singles
Warner Music Group singles
EMI Records singles